Heysham is an unparished area in Lancaster, Lancashire, England. It contains 26 listed buildings that are recorded in the National Heritage List for England.  Of these, four are listed at Grade I, the highest of the three grades, one is at Grade II*, the middle grade, and the others are at Grade II, the lowest grade.  The area is mainly occupied by the village of Heysham, with the coast to the west, and the town of Morecambe to the north.  The headland overlooking the sea contains some ancient structures that are listed, including a ruined chapel and rock-cut tombs.  Most of the other listed buildings are houses, many of them being in the oldest part of the village adjacent to the headland.  Elsewhere the listed buildings include a church and associated structures, a public house, and a well.

Key

Buildings

References

Citations

Sources

Lists of listed buildings in Lancashire
Buildings and structures in the City of Lancaster